Events from the year 1292 in Ireland.

Incumbent
Lord: Edward I

Events

Custody of rents, homages and services of all Crown tenants English and Irish in the Decies and Desmond is granted to Thomas fitz Maurice of Desmond.
Thomas Cantock, Bishop of Emly became Lord Chancellor of Ireland

Births

Deaths

References

 
1290s in Ireland
Ireland
Years of the 13th century in Ireland